The Mary Soper Pope Memorial Award, informally known as the Mary Soper Pope Medal, was awarded by the  Cranbrook Institute of Science of Detroit, Michigan, for notable achievement in plant sciences. It was inaugurated in 1946, and the last award was in 1970. The medal itself was designed by sculptor Marshall Fredericks.

Recipients
1946 Frans Verdoorn
1947 Charles C. Deam
1948 William Vogt
1949 Jens Christian Clausen, David D. Keck, and William Hiesey
1950 David D. Keck
1951 Martín Cárdenas
1952 Emma Lucy Braun
1954 Irving Widmer Bailey
1959 Kenneth Neatby
1962 Edmund H. Fulling
1964 Edgar T. Wherry
1966 Hally Jolivette Sax and Karl Sax
1969 Stanley A. Cain
1970 William Campbell Steere

See also

 List of biology awards

References

External links
The Mary Soper Pope medal (obverse)
Plaster cast for the Mary Soper Pope medal (obverse)

Biology awards
Awards established in 1946
American awards